The position of Speaker of the Landsting (Denmark) was created in 1850 and existed until it was abolished in 1953.

List of speakers of the Landsting
References:

See also
List of speakers of the Folketing

References

Politics of Denmark
Denmark, Folketing
Government of Denmark